George John Dietz (January 9, 1880 – April 19, 1965) was an American rower who competed in the 1904 Summer Olympics. In 1904 he was part of the American boat, which won the gold medal in the coxless fours.

References

External links
 profile

1880 births
1965 deaths
Rowers at the 1904 Summer Olympics
Olympic gold medalists for the United States in rowing
American male rowers
Medalists at the 1904 Summer Olympics